The 6th Bavarian Landwehr Division (6. Bayerische Landwehr-Division) was a unit of the Bavarian Army, part of the Imperial German Army, in World War I.  The division was formed on February 20, 1915.  It was disbanded in 1919 during the demobilization of the German Army after World War I.  It was composed primarily of troops of the Landwehr and the Landsturm from the 1st Bavarian Corps district.

Combat chronicle

The 6th Bavarian Landwehr Division served on the Western Front, entering the line in Upper Alsace.  It fought in the first and second battles of Münster in 1915 and remained in the line in Upper Alsace until the end of the war.  Allied intelligence rated the division as fourth class, noting that it was only used in the calmest sectors of the front.

Order of battle on formation

The 6th Bavarian Landwehr Division was formed as a square division with two brigades of two infantry regiments.  The order of battle of the division on April 11, 1915, was as follows:

1. bayerische Landwehr-Infanterie-Brigade
Kgl. Bayerisches Landwehr-Infanterie-Regiment Nr. 1
Kgl. Bayerisches Landwehr-Infanterie-Regiment Nr. 2
2. bayerische Landwehr-Infanterie-Brigade
Kgl. Bayerisches Landwehr-Infanterie-Regiment Nr. 3
Kgl. Bayerisches Landwehr-Infanterie-Regiment Nr. 12
2. Landwehr-Eskadron/I. Bayerisches Armeekorps
Kgl. Bayerische Landsturm-Feldartillerie-Abteilung Nr. 1
2.Batterie/Landwehr-Fußartillerie-Bataillon Nr. 20
Kgl. Bayerische Landsturm-Pionier-Kompanie Nr. 1/II. Bayerisches Armeekorps

Late-war order of battle

The division underwent several organizational changes over the course of the war.  It was triangularized in December 1916.  It received artillery and signals commands, and combat engineer support was expanded to a full pioneer battalion.  The order of battle on February 28, 1918, was as follows:

1. bayerische Landwehr-Infanterie-Brigade
Kgl. Bayerisches Landwehr-Infanterie-Regiment Nr. 1
Kgl. Bayerisches Landwehr-Infanterie-Regiment Nr. 3
Kgl. Bayerisches Landwehr-Infanterie-Regiment Nr. 12
2. Eskadron/Kgl. Bayerisches 2. Chevaulegers-Regiment Taxis
Kgl. Bayerischer Artillerie-Kommandeur 23
Kgl. Bayerisches Landwehr-Feldartillerie-Regiment Nr. 6
Stab Kgl. Bayerisches Pionier-Bataillon Nr. 26
Kgl. Bayerische Reserve-Pionier-Kompanie Nr. 16
Kgl. Bayerische Landsturm-Pionier-Kompanie Nr. 10
Kgl. Bayerische Minenwerfer-Kompanie Nr. 306
Kgl. Bayerischer Divisions-Nachrichten-Kommandeur 506

References
 6.Bayerische-Landwehr-Division (Chronik 1915/1918) - Der erste Weltkrieg
 Hermann Cron et al., Ruhmeshalle unserer alten Armee (Berlin, 1935)
 Hermann Cron, Geschichte des deutschen Heeres im Weltkriege 1914-1918 (Berlin, 1937)
 Günter Wegner, Stellenbesetzung der deutschen Heere 1825-1939. (Biblio Verlag, Osnabrück, 1993), Bd. 1
 Histories of Two Hundred and Fifty-One Divisions of the German Army which Participated in the War (1914-1918), compiled from records of Intelligence section of the General Staff, American Expeditionary Forces, at General Headquarters, Chaumont, France 1919 (1920)

Notes

Infantry divisions of Germany in World War I
Military units and formations established in 1915
Military units and formations of Bavaria
Military units and formations disestablished in 1919
1915 establishments in Germany